Salem Creek is a  long 3rd order tributary to Richardson Creek in Union County, North Carolina.

Variant names
According to the Geographic Names Information System, it has also been known historically as:
Negro Head Creek
Negrohead Creek
Niggerhead Creek

Course
Salem Creek rises in a pond about 1 mile southeast of Wingate, North Carolina and then flows north to join Richardson Creek about 2 miles south-southwest of New Salem.

Watershed
Salem Creek drains  of area, receives about 48.2 in/year of precipitation, has a wetness index of 412.32, and is about 36% forested.

References

Rivers of North Carolina
Rivers of Union County, North Carolina